Patrick William Donahue (November 8, 1884 – January 31, 1966) was an American professional baseball player who was a catcher in Major League Baseball (MLB) for the Boston Red Sox, Philadelphia Athletics and the Cleveland Naps.

Donahue started playing professional baseball in 1902 in Minor League Baseball when he was only 17. He played as a catcher and first baseman. In the three years he played major-league baseball, he hit three home runs in a total of 119 games. His brother, also a major-league baseball player, was Jiggs Donahue.

Trades
June 10, 1910: Purchased by the Athletics from the Red Sox.
Traded from the Athletics to the Naps and back to the Athletics in 1910.

References

1884 births
1966 deaths
Baseball players from Ohio
Major League Baseball catchers
Boston Red Sox players
Philadelphia Athletics players
Cleveland Indians players
Philadelphia Athletics scouts
Sportspeople from Springfield, Ohio
Utica Pent-Ups players
Stockton Millers players
Portland Beavers players
Memphis Turtles players
Toledo Mud Hens players
Atlanta Crackers players
Montgomery Rebels players
Dayton Veterans players